KVNE (89.5 FM) is a radio station, licensed to Tyler, Texas, United States, owned by the Educational Radio Foundation of East Texas, Inc., and serving the Tyler-Longview market with a Christian contemporary format. Studio location for both stations are at 7695 Old Jacksonville Highway in southwest Tyler.

Translators 
In addition to the main station, KVNE was once relayed to an additional 2 translators, in order to widen its broadcast area. 99.1 K256AT in Nacogdoches was later sold and moved out of the area, while 104.3 K282AM is now used to rebroadcast KIMP in Mt. Pleasant. KVNE was also previously heard on co-owned translator K214BE licensed to Shreveport, Louisiana, which has also since been sold.

References

External links 

Contemporary Christian radio stations in the United States
Radio stations established in 1983
VNE